Executive branch agencies and departments nominally under the authority of the Governor include:

Agency for Health Care Administration (AHCA)
Florida Board of Governors
Florida Department of Agriculture and Consumer Services (FDACS)
Florida Department of Business and Professional Regulation (DBPR)
Florida Department of Children and Families (DCF)
Florida Citrus Commission
Florida Department of Citrus (FDOC)
Florida Department of Corrections (FDC)
Florida State Board of Education
Florida Department of Education (FLDOE)
Florida Department of Elder Affairs (DOEA)
Florida Department of Environmental Protection (DEP)
Florida Department of Health (DOH)
Florida Department of Juvenile Justice (DJJ)
Florida Department of Lottery (Florida Lottery)
Florida Department of Management Services (DMS)
Florida Division of Administrative Hearings
Florida Commission on Human Relations (FCHR)
Florida Department of Military Affairs (DMA) (Florida National Guard)
Florida Department of State (Secretary of State of Florida)
Florida Department of Transportation (DOT)
Executive Office of the Governor
Florida Division of Emergency Management (FDEM)
Florida Fish and Wildlife Conservation Commission (FWCC)

Other executive branch agencies and departments nominally under the authority of the Cabinet include:

Florida Department of Highway Safety and Motor Vehicles (DHSMV)
Florida Department of Law Enforcement (FDLE)
Florida Department of Revenue (DOR)
Florida Department of Veterans Affairs (DVA)
Florida Commission on Offender Review (FCOR) 
Florida State Board of Administration (SBA)

Other agencies include:

Enterprise Florida (EFI)
Florida Agency for Workforce Innovation (AWI)
Florida Department of Community Affairs (DCA)
Florida Space Authority (FSA)
Visit Florida (FL USA)
Volunteer Florida (VOL)

References 

Agencies, departments, and commissions
Florida